Black 'N Blue is the debut album from the glam metal band Black 'n Blue. Recorded in March to April, 1984 and released worldwide the following August, the album includes the band's only song to chart as a single, Hold On to 18. In 2015, the album was ranked 28th at Rolling Stone's "50 Greatest Hair Metal Albums of All Time".

The track "Chains Around Heaven" had previously appeared on both the second and third pressings of the compilation album Metal Massacre (1982).

Track listing
Side one
 "The Strong Will Rock" (Jaime St. James, Tommy Thayer) – 4:06
 "School of Hard Knocks" (St. James, Thayer) – 3:58
 "Autoblast" (St. James, Thayer, Jeff Warner) – 3:53
 "Hold On to 18" (St. James, Thayer) – 4:12
 "Wicked Bitch" (St. James) – 4:17

Side two
"Action" (Brian Connolly, Steve Priest, Andy Scott, Mick Tucker) – 3:36 (Sweet cover)
 "Show Me the Night" (St. James, Thayer) – 4:01
 "One for the Money" (St. James, Thayer) – 4:19
 "I'm the King" (St. James, Thayer, Patrick Young, Pete Holmes) – 3:42
 "Chains Around Heaven" (St. James, Thayer) – 4:00

Personnel
Black 'n Blue
 Jaime St. James – lead and backing vocals
 Tommy Thayer – lead guitar, backing vocals
 Jeff "Woop" Warner – rhythm guitar, backing vocals
 Patrick Young – bass, backing vocals
 Pete Holmes – drums

Production
Dieter Dierks – producer, mixing
Gerd Rautenbach – engineer
Greg Fulginiti – mastering at Artisan Sound Recorders

References

External links
"Black 'n Blue" at discogs

1984 debut albums
Black 'n Blue albums
Geffen Records albums
Albums produced by Dieter Dierks